Peter Wynford Innes Rees, Baron Rees,  (9 December 1926 – 30 November 2008) was a British Conservative politician and barrister. He was Member of Parliament (MP) for Dover and Deal from 1974 to 1983 and MP for Dover from 1970 to 1974 and 1983 to 1987.  He was Chief Secretary to the Treasury from 1983 until 1985. He was created a life peer as Baron Rees, of Goytre, in 1987.

Early life and education
Rees was born in Camberley, Surrey, the only son of Major-General Thomas Wynford Rees of the India Army, and Agatha Rosalie (née Innes). His maternal grandfather was Sir Charles Alexander Innes, Governor of British Burma from 1927 to 1932. He was educated at Stowe School. He joined the Scots Guards in 1945 and three years later continued his education at Christ Church, Oxford. In 1953, he was called to the bar by the Inner Temple. He became a QC in 1969.

Political career
At the 1964 general election Rees stood as the Conservative candidate in the safe Labour seat of Abertillery, where he won only 14% of the votes, against the 86% won by the only other candidate, Labour's Reverend Llewellyn Williams. When Williams died in 1965, Rees was the Conservative candidate in the consequent by-election, losing by a similarly large margin.

At the 1966 election, he stood in the more promising Labour-held seat of Liverpool West Derby, but lost again.

He finally entered Parliament at the 1970 general election, when he won in Dover, with a majority of 1,649 over sitting Labour MP David Ennals.

Parliament
In Edward Heath's government, he served from 1972 to 1973 as Parliamentary Private Secretary to the Solicitor General, Michael Havers.

In 1979, when the Conservative Party entered government under Margaret Thatcher, he became Minister of State at the Treasury, working to the Chancellor of the Exchequer, Geoffrey Howe, before becoming Minister for Trade in 1981.  After the 1983 UK general election he was appointed to the cabinet as Chief Secretary to the Treasury, working to the new Chancellor of the Exchequer, Nigel Lawson.  He was made Privy Counsellor the same year.

Unlike most other Chief Secretaries to the Treasury, Peter Rees never went further within the Cabinet, leaving the post in the September 1985 cabinet reshuffle.  He retired from Parliament at the 1987 general election, aged 61, and on 16 November 1987 was created a life peer as Baron Rees, of Goytre in the County of Gwent and sat in the House of Lords as a Conservative.

Personal life
In 1969, he married Anthea Peronelle Wendell, daughter of Major Hugh John Maxwell-Hyslop, and former wife of Major Jack Wendell. They had no children. Through this marriage, he was the stepfather of Anthea's daughters from her first marriage to Jac Wendell: Francesca and Serena Wendell (later the second wife of John Crichton-Stuart, 7th Marquess of Bute).

Rees died of a spontaneous subarachnoid haemorrhage at St Thomas' Hospital, London, following a short illness.  He was buried at St Peter's Church, Goytre.

Arms

References

External links
 

|-

1926 births
2008 deaths
Alumni of Christ Church, Oxford
Conservative Party (UK) MPs for English constituencies
Conservative Party (UK) life peers
English barristers
People educated at Stowe School
Scots Guards officers
Members of the Privy Council of the United Kingdom
UK MPs 1983–1987
UK MPs 1970–1974
UK MPs 1974
UK MPs 1974–1979
UK MPs 1979–1983
Members of the Parliament of the United Kingdom for Dover
20th-century English lawyers
Chief Secretaries to the Treasury
Life peers created by Elizabeth II